The Hungarian Speedway Championships are annual motorcycle speedway events held each year organized by the HZM.

Winners

Individual

Team

See also 
 Hungary national speedway team

References